Coleophora niveistrigella is a moth of the family Coleophoridae. It is found from Latvia to the Pyrenees and the Alps and from France to Slovakia. It is also found in southern Russia.

Adults are on wing from May to July.

The larvae feed on Gypsophila fastigiata. It is covered with sand grains and has a mouth angle of 45-55°. The larva hibernates in the soil. During hibernation, the narrowed rear end of the case is shed, resulting in a totally different spring case. Cases can be found at the underside of the leaves. Full-grown larvae can be found in mid June.

References

niveistrigella
Moths described in 1877
Moths of Europe